This Philippine Basketball Association (PBA) page is used for splitting purposes to prevent this list from becoming too large. The following list articles have been created for easier navigation among all-time PBA players:

Alphabetical

List of Philippine Basketball Association players (A–E)
List of Philippine Basketball Association players (F–J)
List of Philippine Basketball Association players (K–O)
List of Philippine Basketball Association players (P–T)
List of Philippine Basketball Association players (U–Z)

Specialty

List of Philippine Basketball Association career steals leaders
List of Philippine Basketball Association career scoring leaders
List of Philippine Basketball Association career rebounding leaders
List of Philippine Basketball Association career minutes played leaders
List of Philippine Basketball Association career games played leaders
List of Philippine Basketball Association career free throw scoring leaders
List of Philippine Basketball Association career blocks leaders
List of Philippine Basketball Association career assists leaders
List of Philippine Basketball Association career 3-point scoring leaders
40 Greatest Players in PBA History
List of Philippine Basketball Association imports 

 
players